Events from the year 1627 in Denmark.

Incumbents 
 Monarch – Christian IV

Events
 Ole Worm succeeds Hans Poulsen Resen as rector of the University of Copenhagen.

Births
 28 May  Nikolaj Nissen, judge and landowner (died 1794)
 12 October  Matthias Foss, bishop (died 1783)

Deaths 
 13 May  Alexander, Duke of Schleswig-Holstein-Sonderburg, nobleman (born 1573)

Publications
 Christen Sørensen Longomontanus: De Chronolabio Historico, seu de Tempore Disputationes tres

References 

 
Denmark
Years of the 17th century in Denmark